The Thurrock Independents, also known as the Thurrock Independents Party (TIP), are a localist and populist British political party based in Thurrock, Essex, England. It was formed in January 2018 when seventeen Thurrock councillors, including then-East of England MEP Tim Aker, broke-away from the UK Independence Party (UKIP) after claiming to have grown disillusioned with party politics. At its height in 2018, the party was Thurrock Council's official opposition group and had two members in the European Parliament. It has declined after multiple defections and election defeats and now has three Thurrock councillors.

Description 
In 2018, the former party leadership defected to the Conservative party; and were followed soon after by two incumbent councillors who joined the Conservative Group in November 2018. Following losses in the 2018 local election, this left the party with just ten councillors. In December 2019, party leader Luke Spillman and his deputy Jack Duffin announced plans to leave the party and step down as councillors in Spring 2021. However, in January 2021 both defected to the Conservatives, keeping their seats on the council. The leader of the party is now Gary Byrne.

As of 2022, the party is left with three councillors out of 49 in Thurrock Council, including its leader Gary Byrne.

Although Tim Aker joined his council colleagues in the new group, he subsequently stated that he would continue to represent UKIP in the European Parliament for the purposes of Brexit: "UKIP has a job to do in the European Parliament in seeing we get the Brexit we voted for. I will stay as a UKIP MEP. But to better represent my constituents in Aveley, I had no choice but to follow my colleagues and represent the Thurrock Independents." This situation led to some uncertainty about the status of some of the group's members as a number of them work for Aker. Aker subsequently left UKIP and sat for Thurrock Independents in the European Parliament. However, Aker joined the Brexit Party in February 2019. He resigned his seat on the council having moved away from Thurrock; the group lost the subsequent by-election.

During the 2019 United Kingdom local elections, Allen Mayes took the Tilbury Riverside ward of Thurrock from Labour.

References

2018 establishments in England
Organisations based in Essex
Political parties established in 2018
Locally based political parties in England
Politics of Essex
Thurrock
UK Independence Party
UK Independence Party breakaway groups
2018 establishments in the United Kingdom